Arthur Ronald Nall Nall-Cain, 2nd Baron Brocket KStJ (4 August 1904 – 24 March 1967) was a Conservative Party politician in the United Kingdom.

Early life
He was born into a millionaire brewing family on 4 August 1904. His father, Charles Nall-Cain, was created a baronet in 1921 and Baron Brocket of Brocket Hall in 1933. After his death a year later, Arthur succeeded to his titles.

Nall-Cain was educated at Eton College and Oxford University, where he captained the golf team. He became a barrister and a Hertfordshire County Councillor.

Career
He was elected as Conservative Member of Parliament (MP) for Liverpool Wavertree at a by-election in 1931, and was a close associate of Neville Chamberlain.  After his father died, Nall-Cain was required to leave the House of Commons as he was elevated to the House of Lords.

Brocket inherited two grand houses: Brocket Hall in Hertfordshire and Bramshill Park, in Hampshire. In the 1930s, he bought the Knoydart estate in Lochaber, Scotland, and became an infamous absentee landlord, opposing the rights of crofters and dismissing and evicting workers, preferring the estate for shooting and fishing. He eventually owned 13,000 acres (53 km2) in England and 62,000 in Scotland.

Nazi sympathiser
Brocket became known in society as a Nazi sympathiser. He became a committed member of the Anglo-German Fellowship, and his homes were used for entertaining supporters of Germany.  So identified was Brocket with the cause of Nazi Germany that he attended Hitler's 50th birthday celebration in 1939, and was a close friend of Joachim von Ribbentrop. According to Neville Chamberlain, Foreign Secretary, the Earl of Halifax used Brocket as a conduit to convey the views of the British government to the leading German Nazis.

After the outbreak of World War II, Brocket continued to work for an understanding between Britain and Germany. He urged a negotiated peace settlement and tried to arrange talks with Hitler. He had a contact with Hermann Göring through the Swedish intermediary Bengt Berg. Brocket worked closely with the historian Arthur Bryant, who shared his views and helped bring the negotiations to the attention of the Foreign Office. However, Brocket was informed that the proposal to grant Germany control over Poland and Czechoslovakia was not acceptable to the British government.

Later life
After the War, in 1948, some returning soldiers (the so-called Seven Men of Knoydart), who had fought the Nazis, decided to stake their claim to a portion of the Knoydart estate in a land raid, but they were taken to court by Brocket and dispossessed. Brocket sold the Knoydart estate shortly afterwards. In 1949, he bought the Carton House estate in Ireland.

Personal life
In 1927, Brocket married Angela Beatrix Pennyman, younger daughter of Rev. Preb. William Geoffrey Pennyman of Ormesby Hall in Yorkshire. Together, they were the parents of:

 Ronald Charles Manus Nall-Cain (1928–1961), eldest son and heir apparent, who pre-deceased his father, having in 1950 married Elizabeth Mary Stallard, a daughter of R.J. Stallard of Bake House, Petersfield, Hampshire.
 David Lawrence Robert Nall-Cain (born 1930), 2nd son, who inherited Carton House from his father. He married Katherine Elizabeth Palmer, a daughter of William Matthew Palmer, Viscount Wolmer (1912-1942), eldest son and heir apparent of Roundell Palmer, 3rd Earl of Selborne (1887–1971). In 1977 he sold Carton to the Mallaghan family.
 Elizabeth Angela Veronica Rose Nall-Cain (born 1938), wife of Thomas Taylour, 6th Marquess of Headfort.

Nall-Cain died on 24 March 1967 and was succeeded by his grandson, Charles.

Descendants
Through his eldest son, he was a grandfather to Charles Ronald George Nall-Cain, 3rd Baron Brocket (b. 1952), of Brocket Hall, and through his daughter to Christopher Taylour, 7th Marquess of Headfort.

References

1904 births
1967 deaths
Nall-Cain, Ronald
2
Knights of the Order of St John
People educated at Eton College
Nall-Cain, Ronald
Nall-Cain, Ronald
UK MPs who inherited peerages
Councillors in Hertfordshire
British fascists